Tit-spinetails are small passerine birds of the genus Leptasthenura, belonging to the ovenbird family Furnariidae. They are found in South America, particularly the southern and Andean parts of the continent. They are somewhat similar to birds of the tit family in their shape and feeding behaviour, hence the first part of their name. The "spinetail" part of their name refers to their long, pointed tail feathers. Tit-spinetails have short rounded wings, short pointed bills and are mainly brown in colour. Their nests are built in holes or in the old nests of other birds.

Taxonomy
The genus Leptasthenura was introduced in 1853 by the German naturalist Ludwig Reichenbach. The name combines the Ancient Greek leptos meaning "thin", asthenēs meaning "weak" and oura meaning "tail". The type species was designated as the plain-mantled tit-spinetail by George Robert Gray in 1855.

Species
The genus contains nine species:
 Andean tit-spinetail, Leptasthenura andicola
 Streak-backed tit-spinetail, Leptasthenura striata
 Rusty-crowned tit-spinetail, Leptasthenura pileata
 White-browed tit-spinetail, Leptasthenura xenothorax
 Striolated tit-spinetail, Leptasthenura striolata
 Plain-mantled tit-spinetail, Leptasthenura aegithaloides
 Tufted tit-spinetail, Leptasthenura platensis
 Brown-capped tit-spinetail, Leptasthenura fuliginiceps
 Araucaria tit-spinetail, Leptasthenura setaria

The tawny tit-spinetail	is placed together with Des Murs's wiretail in the genus Sylviorthorhynchus.

References

Taxa named by Ludwig Reichenbach